Gheorghe Iulian Axinia (also known as Gheorghe Axinia I, born 27 July 1968) is a Romanian former footballer who played as a defender. His brother Florin Axinia was also a footballer, they played together at Ceahlăul Piatra Neamț.

Honours
Ceahlăul Piatra Neamț
Divizia B: 1992–93

Notes

References

1968 births
Living people
Romanian footballers
Association football defenders
Liga I players
Liga II players
CSM Ceahlăul Piatra Neamț players
Sportspeople from Piatra Neamț